The LSWR 302 class was a class of 0-6-0 steam locomotives designed by William George Beattie for the London and South Western Railway (LSWR). Thirty-six locomotives were built between 1874 and 1878.

Description
The thirty-six locomotives were built by Beyer, Peacock and Company in three batches of twelve.

Thirty-two locomotives were rebuilt by William Adams between 1886 and 1894; they received new boilers and standard fittings.

Seven locomotives were withdrawn between 1889 and 1893; this included four locomotives that had been rebuilt. The remaining 29 locomotives were placed on the duplicate list between 1894 and 1902. Withdrawals recommenced in 1903, and by the end of 1922, only fifteen remained in service to pass to the Southern Railway at grouping. These were all withdrawn by the end of 1925; all were scrapped.

References

302
0-6-0 locomotives
Railway locomotives introduced in 1874
Scrapped locomotives
Standard gauge steam locomotives of Great Britain
Beyer, Peacock locomotives